Belgium competed at the 2020 Summer Olympics in Tokyo. Originally scheduled to take place from 24 July to 9 August 2020, the Games were postponed to 23 July to 8 August 2021, because of the COVID-19 pandemic. Since the nation's official debut in 1900, Belgian athletes have appeared in every edition of the Summer Olympic Games, with the exception of the 1904 Summer Olympics in St. Louis.

Medalists

Competitors

Archery

Belgium archers booked an Olympic place in the men’s individual recurve based on the world ranking.

Athletics

Belgian athletes further achieved the entry standards, either by qualifying time or by world ranking, in the following track and field events (up to a maximum of 3 athletes in each event):

DNS = Did not start
NM = No valid trial recorded

Track & road events
Men

Women

Mixed

Field events

Combined events – Men's decathlon

Combined events – Women's heptathlon

Badminton

Belgium entered one badminton player into the Olympic tournament. Set to compete at her third consecutive Games, Lianne Tan secured a spot in the women's singles at the Games based on the BWF Race to Tokyo Rankings.

Basketball

Indoor
Summary

Women's tournament

Belgium women's basketball team qualified for the first time for the Olympics as one of two highest-ranked eligible squads at the Ostend meet of the 2020 FIBA Women's Olympic Qualifying Tournament.

Team roster

Group play

Quarterfinal

3×3 basketball
Summary

Men's tournament

Belgium men's national 3x3 team qualified for the Olympics by securing a top finish at the 2021 Universality Olympic Qualifying Tournament.

Team roster
The players were announced on 3 July 2021.

Rafael Bogaerts
Nick Celis
Thierry Mariën
Thibaut Vervoort

Group play

Semifinal

Bronze medal match

Canoeing

Slalom
Belgium entered one canoeist to compete in the men's K-1 class at the Games, as the International Canoe Federation accepted the nation's request to claim an unused berth from the 2020 Oceania Championships.

Sprint
Belgium qualified a boat in the women's K-2 200 m for the Games by finishing fourth overall and second among those nations eligible for Olympic qualification at the 2019 ICF Canoe Sprint World Championships in Szeged, Hungary. Meanwhile, one additional boat was awarded to the Belgian canoeist in the men's K-1 1000 m by winning the gold medal at the 2021 European Canoe Sprint Qualification Regatta.

Qualification Legend: FA = Qualify to final (medal); FB = Qualify to final B (non-medal)

Cycling

Road
Belgium entered a squad of eight riders (five men and three women) to compete in their respective Olympic road races, by virtue of their top 50 national finish (for men) and top 22 (for women) in the UCI World Ranking.

Men

Women

Track
Following the completion of the 2020 UCI Track Cycling World Championships, Belgian riders accumulated spots for both men and women in madison and omnium based on their country's results in the final UCI Olympic rankings.

Omnium

Madison

* Lindsay De Vylder and Shari Bossuyt will travel as reserves

Mountain biking
Belgian mountain bikers qualified for one men's and one women's quota place each into the Olympic cross-country race, as a result of the nation's thirteenth-place-finish for men and fourteenth for women, respectively, in the UCI Olympic Ranking List of 16 May 2021.

BMX

Race

Equestrian

Belgium fielded a squad of three equestrian riders into the Olympic team jumping competition by winning the gold medal and securing the first of three available berths for Group A and B at the European Championships in Rotterdam, Netherlands. Meanwhile, two riders were added to the Spanish roster based on the following results in the individual FEI Olympic rankings: a top two finish outside the group selection for Group B (South Western Europe) in eventing and a highest overall placement outside the group and continental selection in dressage.

With Ireland withdrawing from the team dressage competition, Belgium received an invitation from FEI to send a dressage team to the Games, as the highest-ranked composite team, not yet represented. Belgium is hence set to compete in team dressage for the first time since Amsterdam 1928.

Belgian equestrian squads for eventing and jumping were named on June 24, 2021. The dressage team was named on July 3, 2021.

Dressage
Alexa Fairchild and Dabanos have been named the travelling alternates.

Qualification Legend: Q = Qualified for the final; q = Qualified for the final as a lucky loser

Eventing

Jumping
Yves Vanderhasselt and Jeunesse were originally named as the travelling alternates, but for veterinary reasons were replaced by Pieter Devos and Claire Z.

Field hockey

Summary

Men's tournament

Belgium men's field hockey team qualified for the Olympics by winning the gold medal at the 2019 EuroHockey Nations Championships in Antwerp.

Team roster

Group play

Quarterfinal

Semifinal

Gold medal game

Golf

Belgium entered a total of two male golfers and one female golfer into the Olympic tournament.

Gymnastics

Artistic
Belgium fielded a full squad of four gymnasts in the women's artistic gymnastics events by finishing seventh out of nine nations eligible for qualification in the team all-around at the 2019 World Artistic Gymnastics Championships in Stuttgart, Germany.

Women
Team

Individual finals

Judo

Four Judoka have qualified through being in the top 18 of the IJF World Ranking List in their respective class. Additionally, Gabriella Willems received one of the additional places for European athletes, but was unable to compete due to a knee injury.

Rowing

Belgium qualified one boat in the men's lightweight double sculls for the Games by winning the B-final and securing the last of seven berths available at the 2019 FISA World Championships in Ottensheim, Austria.

Qualification Legend: FA=Final A (medal); FB=Final B (non-medal); FC=Final C (non-medal); FD=Final D (non-medal); FE=Final E (non-medal); FF=Final F (non-medal); SA/B=Semifinals A/B; SC/D=Semifinals C/D; SE/F=Semifinals E/F; QF=Quarterfinals; R=Repechage

Sailing

Belgian sailors qualified one boat in each of the following classes through the 2018 Sailing World Championships, the class-associated Worlds, and the continental regattas.

M = Medal race; EL = Eliminated – did not advance into the medal race

Shooting

Belgian shooters achieved quota places for the following events by virtue of their best finishes at the 2018 ISSF World Championships, the 2019 ISSF World Cup series, and Asian Championships, as long as they obtained a minimum qualifying score (MQS) of June 5, 2021.

Skateboarding

Lore Bruggeman and Axel Cruysberghs have qualified for the games by finishing top 16 in the Olympic world skateboarding rankings for the women's street and men's street competitions respectively.

Swimming 

Belgian swimmers achieved qualifying standards in the following events (up to a maximum of 2 swimmers in each event at the Olympic Qualifying Time (OQT), and potentially 1 at the Olympic Selection Time (OST)): Two-time Olympian Pieter Timmers originally qualified in 2019, however he officially announced his retirement from the sport at the end of 2020 swimming season and instead returned their quota spot.

Taekwondo

Belgium entered one athlete into the taekwondo competition at the Games. Rio 2016 Olympian Jaouad Achab qualified directly for the men's lightweight category (68 kg) by finishing among the top five taekwondo practitioners at the end of the WT Olympic Rankings.

Tennis

Triathlon

Belgium qualified four triathletes for the following events at the Games by winning the gold medal and securing the first of three available berths at the 2021 ITU Mixed Relay Olympic Qualification Tournament in Lisbon, Portugal.

Individual

Relay

Weightlifting

Belgian weightlifters qualified for two quota places at the games, based on the Tokyo 2020 Rankings Qualification List of 11 June 2021.

See also
Belgium at the 2020 Summer Paralympics

References

Nations at the 2020 Summer Olympics
2020
2021 in Belgian sport